Hemlock Creek is a stream in the U.S. state of Wisconsin. It is a tributary to the Yellow River.

Hemlock trees along the creek's watercourse may account for the name.

References

Rivers of Wood County, Wisconsin
Rivers of Wisconsin